Frank H. Pope (March 7, 1854 – January 27, 1927) was an elocutionist and newspaper reporter who served as a State Representative and  Massachusetts Auditor from 1914–1915.  He served one term as Auditor. He was later the State Commissioner of Small Loans.

Early life and family
Frank Hinckley Pope was born in Sandwich, Massachusetts, on Cape Cod on March 7, 1854, to John W. Pope and Susan Cobb Hinckley.
  The family later moved to Marlboro, Massachusetts, and in 1877, Pope married Kate Yeaw.

Career
Pope became a correspondent for the Boston Globe in 1881 serving in that capacity until he was elected to statewide office in 1914. The Popes moved to Leominster, Massachusetts.  In 1906, he wrote Leominster's Lesson to the Growing Cities of Massachusetts.  From 1908 to 1912, he served as member of the Massachusetts House of Representatives, elected as a Democrat representing Worcester County, District 11 which included Leominster.  He then ran on the Democratic ticket for State Auditor in 1913 and was elected to one term.  Pope was appointed Supervisor of Loans for the state by Governor David I. Walsh.  He was reappointed to this position by Governor Samuel W. McCall in 1918.

Death
Pope died on January 27, 1927, in Brookline, Massachusetts.

References

 

State auditors of Massachusetts
1854 births
1927 deaths
Massachusetts Democrats
People from Sandwich, Massachusetts
People from Leominster, Massachusetts
Elocutionists